Seville is an unincorporated community and census-designated place in Volusia County, Florida, United States, founded in 1882.  As of the 2010 census it had a population of 614.

History

William Kemble Lente, a vice president of the Jacksonville, Tampa and Key West Railway, founded the town of Seville in 1882 along the railroad right of way. Taking advantage of the location, he set about to build a community. He founded the Bank of Seville and built a large brick residence for himself. Teaming up with some northern investors, they started work on a grand hotel. Next the group built a complex water system costing $60,000. The relationship between Lente and his backers became strained and then bitter, and Lent killed himself at his Seville home in 1889. Today with limited commercial development and a largely rural/agricultural base, Seville is a quiet community just north of Pierson along U.S. Route 17.

Demographics

References

Census-designated places in Volusia County, Florida
Populated places established in 1882
Census-designated places in Florida
Unincorporated communities in Volusia County, Florida
Unincorporated communities in Florida
Former municipalities in Florida